Union Church is a former Protestant church in Shanghai, built in Gothic style in 1886. The building housed factory offices after 1949, when its steeple was removed. By 2005 it was neglected and became part of the restoration efforts of the Waitanyuan Project. While undergoing renovations, in 2007, it was ravaged by a fire and restored in 2010.

It served as a venue at the 9th Shanghai Biennale 2012 with an exhibition of Vincent Ward's art.

References 

 

Churches in Shanghai
2007 in China